The Urbión Group is a geological group in Castile and León and La Rioja, Spain whose strata date back to the Early Cretaceous (late Hauterivian to late Barremian. The formations of the group comprise a sequence of brown limestones in a matrix of black silt, sandstones, claystones and conglomerates deposited under terrestrial conditions, in alluvial fan and fluvial environments.

Dinosaur remains are among the fossils that have been recovered from the formation.

Description 
The Urbión Group, named after the Picos de Urbión, comprises a sequence of brown limestones in a matrix of black silt, sandstones, claystones and conglomerates deposited under terrestrial conditions, in alluvial fan and fluvial environments.

The contact with the overlying Enciso Group is exposed at the Presa Enciso tracksite.

Fossil content

Demandasaurus darwini 
In geological terms, this area lies within the western Cameros Basin, which is located in the north−westernmost part of the Iberian Range, outcropping in the provinces of Burgos, Soria and La Rioja. This basin is one of the most subsident basins formed during the rift interval at the end of the Jurassic and the Early Cretaceous, which affected this part of the Iberian Peninsula.

The sediments of the Tenadas de los Vallejos II quarry belong to the Castrillo de la Reina Formation and comprise red clay beds intercalated with sheet−like sandstone channel fills that are interpreted as floodplain and fluvial channel deposits respectively. The fluvial system of the Castrillo de la Reina Formation shows a braided channel pattern with well developed and drained floodplains. This lithostratigraphic unit belongs to the fifth depositional sequence of the six ones that divide the basin. The age of the fifth depositional sequence is Late Barremian to Early Aptian as is suggested by charophyte and ostracod biostratigraphy.

The Tenadas de los Vallejos II site was discovered in 1999 during prospection work carried out by the Archaeological−Palaeontological Group of Salas de los Infantes (Colectivo Arqueológico−Paleontológico de Salas de los Infantes, CAS). 

Ten caudal vertebrae, a haemal arch, two ischia and a femur, as well as bone fragments were collected in the site. Approximately 810 skeletal elements and bone fragments were recovered, and most of them belong to a single specimen of rebbachisaurid sauropod. The remains were found disarticulated in the same bed and in close proximity to each other. The neural arches of the vertebrae are firmly co−ossified to the centra. There are no anatomically repeated elements, and the bones correspond presumably to a single individual. In addition, several vertebral centra and femur fragments from a small ornithopod, two spinosaurid theropod vertebrae and a crocodile tooth were recovered from the site.

Other fossils 
Among others, the following fossils have been reported from the Urbión Group:

 Chitracephalus dumonii - Pinilla de los Moros Formation
 Larachelus morla - Pinilla de los Moros Formation
 Europatitan eastwoodi - Castrillo de la Reina Formation
 Goniopholis sp.
 Lepidotes sp.
 Polacanthus sp.
 Baryonychinae indet.
 Crocodyliformes indet.
 Hypsilophodontidae indet.
 Iguanodontia indet.
 Rhabdodontidae indet.
 Testudines indet.

 ichnofossils
 Brachyguanodonipus sp.

Correlation

See also 

 List of dinosaur-bearing rock formations

References

Bibliography 
 
   Material was copied from this source, which is available under a Creative Commons Attribution 4.0 International License.

Further reading 
 A. Pérez-García and X. Murelaga. 2012. Larachelus morla, gen. et sp. nov., a new member of the little-known European Early Cretaceous record of stem cryptodiran turtles. Journal of Vertebrate Paleontology 32(6):1293-1302
 P. Ansorena, I. Díaz Martínez, and F. Pérez Lorente. 2008. Mina Victoria (Navajún) y Valdeperillo (Cornago). Nuevos yacimientos de icnitas de dinosaurio en El Grupo de Urbión (Cuenca de Cameros. La Rioja. España) [Mina Victoria (Navajún) and Valdeperillo (Cornago). New dinosaur footprint localities in the Urbión Group (Cameros Basin. La Rioja. Spain)]. Zubía 25–26:75-96
 F. Torcida Fernández Baldor. 2005. Los dinosaurios de Castilla y León [The dinosaurs of Castilla y León]. Patrimonio Histórico de Castilla y León 6(23):23-34
 J. I. Ruiz Omeñaca and J. I. Canudo. 2003. Dinosaurios (Saurischia, Ornithischia) en el Barremiense (Cretácico Inferior) de la península Ibérica [Dinosaurs (Saurischia, Ornithischia) in the Barremian (Lower Cretaceous) of the Iberian peninsula]. In F. Pérez Lorente (ed.), Dinosaurios y Otros Reptiles Mesozóicos de España 269-312
 F. Torcida Fernández, L. A. Izquierdo Montero, P. Huerta Hurtado, D. Montero Huerta, and G. Pérez Martínez. 2003. Dientes de dinosaurios (Theropoda, Sauropoda), en el Cretácico Inferior de Burgos (España) [Teeth of dinosaurs (Theropoda, Sauropoda), in the Lower Cretaceous of Burgos (Spain)]. In F. Pérez Lorente, M. M. Romero Molina & P. Rivas Carrera (eds.), Dinosaurios y Otros Reptiles Mesozoicos en España. Congreso Internacional sobre Dinosaurios y otros Reptiles Mesozoicos en España, Logroño 335-346
 F. Pérez Lorente. 2002. La distribución de yacimientos y de tipos de huellas de dinosaurios en la Cuenca de Cameroa (La Rioja, Burgos, Soria, España) [The distribution of localities and types of dinosaur footprints in the Cameros Basin (La Rioja, Burgos, Soria, Spain)]. Zubia Monográfico 14:191-210
  X. Pereda Suberbiola, M. Meijide, F. Torcida, J. Welle, C. Fuentes, L. A. Izquierdo, D. Montero, G. Pérez, and V. Urién. 1999. Espinas dermicas del dinosaurio anquilosaurio Polacanthus en las facies Weald de Salas de los Infantes (Burgos, España) [Dermal spines of the ankylosaurian dinosaur Polacanthus in the Weald facies of Salas de los Infantes (Burgos, Spain)]. Estudios Geológicos 55:267-272
 F. Ortega, J. J. Moratalla, A.G. Buscalioni, J. S. Sanz, S. Jiménez and J. Valbuena. 1996. Sobre la presencia de un cocodrilo fósil (Crocodylomorpha: Neosuchia: Goniopholis sp.) en la Cuenca de Cameros (Cretácico inferior: Vadillos-San Román de Cameroa, La Rioja). Zubía 14:113-120

Geologic groups of Europe
Geologic formations of Spain
Lower Cretaceous Series of Europe
Cretaceous Spain
Barremian Stage
Hauterivian Stage
Limestone formations
Sandstone formations
Shale formations
Conglomerate formations
Alluvial deposits
Fluvial deposits
Ichnofossiliferous formations
Paleontology in Spain
Formations
Formations